TSB Stadium is an indoor stadium located adjacent to Pukekura Park in New Plymouth, Taranaki, New Zealand, with main vehicle access off Coronation Avenue.

Events
Events held at TSB Stadium include:
 Basketball – Taranaki Mountainairs (NZNBL), New Zealand Breakers (ANBL)
 Music Shows – G-TARanaki Six60, INXS, Westlife, Beach Boys, Motorhead
 Trade Shows - Home and Lifestyle Expo, Careers Expo, Craft Shows, Oil and Gas Expos, NZ Tattoo and Art Festival
 School Careers Exhibitions

External links
 

1992 establishments in New Zealand
Sport in New Plymouth
Buildings and structures in New Plymouth
Sports venues in Taranaki
Indoor arenas in New Zealand
Boxing venues in New Zealand
1990s architecture in New Zealand